The state of Assam in India has five regional divisions, each comprising a number of districts. The person responsible for the administration of a division is designated as a Divisional Commissioner.

History 

In 1874, Assam was constituted as a Chief Commissioner's province with the seat of the government in Shillong, the erstwhile capital of Assam, which is now in Meghalaya. To better administer the six districts of Goalpara, Kamrup, Sonitpur, Nagaon (formerly, Nowgong), Sivasagar (formerly, Sibsagar) and Lakhimpur, (the districts in the Brahmaputra valley, also called Assam Valley), the Judge of Assam Valley was given the additional charge of a commissioner in 1880. In 1905, the offices of the Judge and the Commissioner were segregated in the Assam Valley; in addition to adding a separate Commissioner's office for the administration of the Hill Districts and Surma Valley.

List of divisions

Current divisions

Proposed divisions (new)

Municipal corporations

Municipal corporation (present)
 Guwahati

Municipal corporation (proposed)

 Silchar
Dibrugarh

Oldest recognised and constantly inhabited urban areas
The list of the oldest urban areas based on the earliest years of formation of the civic bodies, constituted before India's Independence of 1947.

Notes

References

 
 

 
Assam-related lists